Kohneh Guyeh-ye Pain (also Romanized as Kohneh Gūyeh-ye Pā’īn; also known as Kohneh Gūyeh) is a village in Shabkhus Lat Rural District, Rankuh District, Amlash County, Gilan Province, Iran. At the 2006 census, its population was 111, in 36 families.

References 

Populated places in Amlash County